Cambewarra is located in New South Wales, Australia. It lies on the Kangaroo Valley–Nowra road, about 11 km northwest of Nowra and south of Cambewarra Mountain. Cambewarra is a largely rural area, which surrounds Cambewarra Village.

References

City of Shoalhaven
Localities in New South Wales